The Blanc chloromethylation (also called the Blanc reaction) is the chemical reaction of aromatic rings with formaldehyde and hydrogen chloride to form chloromethyl arenes.  The reaction is catalyzed by Lewis acids such as zinc chloride.  The reaction was discovered by Gustave Louis Blanc (1872-1927) in 1923

Mechanism and scope
The reaction is carried out under acidic conditions and with a ZnCl2 catalyst. These conditions protonate the formaldehyde carbonyl making the carbon much more electrophilic. The aldehyde is then attacked by the aromatic pi-electrons, followed by rearomatization of the aromatic ring. The benzyl alcohol thus formed is quickly converted to the chloride under the reaction conditions.

Other possibilities for the electrophile include (chloromethyl)oxonium cation (ClH2C–OH2+) or chlorocarbenium cation (ClCH2+), which may be formed in the presence of zinc chloride. These species may account for the fact that moderately and strongly deactivated substrates that are inert to Friedel-Crafts reactions like acetophenone, nitrobenzene and p-chloronitrobenzene do show marginal reactivity of limited synthetic utility under chloromethylation conditions. Deactivated substrates give better results under modified chloromethylation conditions using chloromethyl methyl ether (MOMCl) in the presence of 60% H2SO4.

Highly activated arenes like phenols and anilines are not suitable substrates, since they undergo further electrophilic attack by Friedel-Crafts alkylation with the formed benzylic alcohol/chloride in an uncontrolled manner. In general, the formation of diarylmethane side product is a common outcome.

Although the reaction is an efficient means of introducing a chloromethyl group, the production of small amounts of highly carcinogenic bis(chloromethyl) ether is a disadvantage for industrial applications.

The corresponding fluoromethylation, bromomethylation and iodomethylation reactions can also be achieved, using the appropriate hydrohalic acid.

Related chloromethylations
Chloromethylation of thiols can be effected with concentrated HCl and formaldehyde:
ArSH + CH2O + HCl → ArSCH2Cl + H2O

Chloromethylation can also be effected using chloromethyl methyl ether:
ArH + CH3OCH2Cl → ArCH2Cl + CH3OH 
This reaction is employed in the chloromethylation of styrene in the production of ion-exchange resins and Merrifield resins.

Additional reading

Safety
The reaction is performed with care as, like most chloromethylation reactions, it produces highly carcinogenic bis(chloromethyl) ether as a by-product.

See also
Friedel-Crafts alkylation
Quelet reaction
Bouveault–Blanc reduction

References

Carbon-carbon bond forming reactions
Name reactions
Substitution reactions